Zhang Yang (born 1967) is a Chinese film director, screenwriter, and occasional actor. He is the son of film director, Zhang Huaxun.

Zhang grew up in Beijing, studied until 1988 at Sun Yat-sen University in Guangdong, from which he graduated with a degree in Chinese literature, and then went to the Central Academy of Drama, graduating in 1992.

Career
Zhang Yang uses a realistic style, and achieved great recognition for his 1999 independent production Xizao (English translation: Shower), which was successful at Chinese box offices as well as  international film festivals.  This was followed in 2001 by Zuotian ("Quitting" in its American release). The actors in this unusual story about a real actor, Jia Hongsheng, and his struggle with drug addiction are Jia himself, Jia's parents, fellow inmates in a mental institution, the director, Zhang, and others playing themselves. The relationship between parents and their grown children is as central to this film as it was in Shower.

Filmography

As director

As actor

References

External links

Zhang Yang at the Chinese Movie Database
Interview with Zhang Yang from BBC-Films

1967 births
Living people
Male actors from Beijing
Film directors from Beijing
Screenwriters from Beijing
Central Academy of Drama alumni
People's Republic of China writers
Chinese male film actors